The 2013 Odlum Brown Vancouver Open was a professional tennis tournament played on outdoor hard courts. It was the 9th edition, for men, and 12th edition, for women, of the tournament and part of the 2013 ATP Challenger Tour and the 2013 ITF Women's Circuit, offering totals of $100,000, for men, and $100,000, for women, in prize money. It took place in West Vancouver, British Columbia, Canada between July 29 to August 4, 2013.

Men's singles main-draw entrants

Seeds

1Rankings are as of July 22, 2013

Other entrants
The following players received wildcards into the singles main draw:
 Philip Bester
 Frank Dancevic
 Austin Krajicek
 Tennys Sandgren

The following players received entry into the singles main draw by special exempts:
 Filip Peliwo
 James Ward

The following players received entry from the qualifying draw:
 John-Patrick Smith
 Benjamin Mitchell
 James McGee
 Nicolas Meister

Women's singles main-draw entrants

Seeds

1 Rankings are as of July 22, 2013

Other entrants
The following players received wildcards into the singles main draw:
 Elisabeth Fournier
 Sanaz Marand
 Natalie Pluskota
 Carol Zhao

The following players received entry from the qualifying draw:
 Naomi Broady
 Jade Windley
 Miharu Imanishi
 Emily Webley-Smith

Champions

Men's singles

  Vasek Pospisil def.  Daniel Evans, 6–0, 1–6, 7–5

Women's singles

 Johanna Konta def.  Sharon Fichman, 6–4, 6–2

Men's doubles

 Jonathan Erlich /  Andy Ram def.  James Cerretani /  Adil Shamasdin, 6–1, 6–4

Women's doubles

 Sharon Fichman /  Maryna Zanevska def.  Jacqueline Cako /  Natalie Pluskota, 6–2, 6–2

References

External links
Official website

Vancouver Open
Odlum Brown Vancouver Open
Odlum Brown Vancouver Open
Odlum Brown Vancouver Open
Odlum Brown Vancouver Open
Odlum Brown Vancouver Open